The Spanish Draft Constitution of 1873 was intended to regulate the First Spanish Republic. It was written mainly by Emilio Castelar, who intended to transform Spain from a unitary state into a federation but the project failed to gain the approval by Parliament.

Beyond the legal irrelevance of a document which never entered into force, this document is of political importance, being the first constitutional proposal in Spanish political history which would try to find a solution to an issue that has become more acute with the passage time: the territorial governance of the Spanish state.

The draft planned to divide the federation into seventeen states: Andalucía Alta ("High Andalusia"), Andalucía Baja ("Low Andalusia"), Aragón, Asturias, Baleares (Balearic Islands), Canarias (Canary Islands), Castilla la Nueva ("New Castile"), Castilla la Vieja ("Old Castile"), Cataluña ("Catalonia"), Cuba, Extremadura, Galicia, Murcia, Navarra, Puerto Rico, Valencia and Regiones Vascongadas ("Basque Provinces"). Following the creation of these states, it is also stated that the territories of the Philippine Islands, Fernando Poo, "Annobon", "Corisco", and the establishments of Africa shall be elevated to the status of States by the "public Powers" "in accordance to the progression" of these territories.

References

Bibliography 
 

http://www.cervantesvirtual.com/obra-visor/proyecto-de-constitucion-federal-de-17-de-julio-1873/html/9f16f016-8564-4c4f-89e0-fbb00501b644_2.html

1873 in law
Defunct constitutions
Constitutions of Spain
Legal history of Spain
1873 in Spain
Federalism in Spain